Macremphytus is a genus of common sawflies in the family Tenthredinidae. There are at least four described species in Macremphytus.

Species
These four species belong to the genus Macremphytus:
 Macremphytus lovetti MacGillivray, 1923
 Macremphytus semicornis Say, 1836
 Macremphytus tarsatus (dogwood sawfly)
 Macremphytus testaceus (Norton, 1861)

References

Further reading

External links

 

Tenthredinidae